The Korean Publishers Association has a membership of 620 publishers in Korea and is the main voice of the nation's publishing industry and organizes the Seoul International Book Fair as well as Korean collective stands in the various international book fairs including the 2014 London Book Fair. It also publishes the "Korean Publishing Journal" and "Korean Publication Yearbook".

Work
The KPA organizes the five-day Seoul International Book Fair, which celebrates its 20th anniversary on June 18 to coincide with the opening. Aside from raising awareness about the importance of reading among Koreans and promoting the Korean publishing industry to the world, the fair aims to facilitate the international book trade. Last year, over 25 countries, 610 exhibitors and 129,210 visitors attended the fair.

History

Jun. 2006	 Official inauguration of the Organization Committee of the 2008 IPA Publishers  Congress, Seoul
Opening of the Books from Korea website (www.koreabooks.net)
The 12th Seoul International Book Fair
May. 2006	Mr. NA, Choon-ho renewed his Presidency of the Asian Pacific Publishers Association
Apr. 2006	Formation of the Organizing Committee and the Executive Committee of the 2008 IPA   Publishers Congress, Seoul	
Nov. 2005	Open forum on the prospectus of the foundation of the Korea Publishing Council
Oct. 2005	Korea, the Guest of Honour at the 2005 Frankfurt Book Fair
Jun. 2005	The 11th Seoul International Book Fair
Feb. 2005	Korea, the Guest of Honour at the 2005 Taipei International Book Fair
Mr. PARK, Maeng-ho elected as the 45th President of the Korean Publishers Association	
Oct. 2004	Launch of the ‘Korean Publishing Culture Awards’
Jun. 2004	Formal announcement of the 2008 IPA Congress to be held in Seoul, Korea
The 10th Seoul International Book Fair
Mar. 2004	Korea, the Guest of Honour at the 2004 Bangkok International Book Fair	
Oct. 2003	Official inauguration of the Korean Organizing Committee for the Guest of Honour at the 2005 Frankfurt Book Fair
Feb. 2003	Monthly magazine “Publishing Journal” re-launched
Enactment of the “Publishing and Printing Industry Promotion Act”
26 Aug. 2002	Promulgation of the “Publishing and Printing Industry Promotion Act”	
Oct. 2001	Became a member of the Executive Committee of the International Publishers Association
30 May. 2001	Hosted the Annual General Meeting of the Asian Pacific Publishers Association
Jan. 2001	Launch of the Modernization of the Book Distribution System (three-year project)		
Aug. 2000	Mr. NA, Choon-ho elected as the president of the Asian Pacific Publishers Association
Jun. 2000	Establishment of the Korea Reprographic & Translation Rights Center	
25 Jun. 1999	Launch of the Homepage of the Korean Publishers Association at www.kpa21.or.kr
Oct. 1999	“Books from Korea” published
Sep. 1998	“50 Years of History of the Korean Publishers Association” published
17 May. 1995	Launch of the Seoul International Book Fair
26 Jan. 1994	Became a member of the Asian Pacific Publishers Association
25 Aug. 1992	1993 designated as the “Book Year”	
11 Oct. 1987	11 October designated as “National Book Day”
Dec. 1987	“40 Years History of the Korean Publishers Association” published
Jun. 1984	Launch of “The Selection of This Month's Books for Youth”
Feb. 1983	Launch of “The Korea Science & Technology Book Awards”
Mar. 1980	Launch of “The Korea Children's Book Awards”	
Jun. 1975	Establishment of the Publishing Culture Hall	
Jan. 1962	KPA commissioned as an agency for the legal deposit of books
Apr. 1957	Became a member of the International Publishers Association
26 Mar. 1952	KPA approved as a corporate juridical person by the Government
Feb. 1948	Launch of the monthly magazine “Chulpan-Munhwa” (Publishing Culture)
15 Mar. 1947	Foundation of the Korean Publishers Association

References

Geography of Korea
1947 establishments in South Korea
Mass media in South Korea